Graham Bencini (born 25 July 1976 in Sliema, Malta) is a former professional footballer who last played for Maltese First Division side Tarxien Rainbows, where he played as a defender.

Bencini played twice for the Malta national team in 1999, once in a friendly match against Bosnia and Herzegovina and once in a Euro 2000 qualifier against FR Yugoslavia.

Playing career

Sliema Wanderers
Bencini began playing football when he was eight years old. He joined the Sliema Wanderers nursery, where he stayed for ten years winning all youth championship honours during that time.

At 18 years old, Graham was promoted to the senior team, and made his Maltese Premier League debut against Naxxar Lions, during this time Bencini was also a member of the Malta U21 team.

Despite only playing one game for Sliema Wanderers, Graham won a medal in his first professional season, with Sliema Wanderers been crowned champions for the 1995–96 season.

Naxxar Lions
With first team opportunities hard to come by at Sliema Wanderers, Bencini joined fellow Maltese Premier League side Naxxar Lions the following season.

In his first season with Naxxar Lions, Bencini was voted as the Player of The Year, and made 22 appearances and even scored his first goal in the Maltese Premier League.

The following season, Graham made 25 appearances and helped secure an eighth-place finish and another season in Premier League.

Birkirkara
For the 1998–99 season, Graham Bencini was signed by Birkirkara, upon joining Birkirkara, Bencini was also selected for the first time to form part on the Malta national team under the guidance of Josep Ilic.

Bencini stayed with Birkirkara for three seasons, making 65 appearances and winning three trophies, the Premier League (1999–00), MFA Super 5 Lottery Tournament (1998) and the Euro Challenge/Lowenbrau Cup (1998).

He also got the chance to take part in two exhibition matches against Juventus and Manchester United.

Ħamrun Spartans
For the 2001–02 season, Bencini left Birkirkara and joined fellow Premier League side Hamrun Spartans.

Graham spent three seasons with the club, making 53 appearances and scoring two goals.

Sliema Wanderers
Following some good form with Hamrun Spartans, Bencini re-joined his home town club Sliema Wanderers in January 2004.

He spent half a season with Sliema Wanderers, making five appearances, and winning his third Premier League, as well as the Maltese Cup and the MFA Super 5 Lottery Tournament.

Floriana
In May 2004, Bencini joined Floriana for the 2004–05 season.

Graham only made a total four appearances with Floriana due to an injury ravaged season where he spent most of the season in the treatment room.

Għajnsielem
Bencini then moved to join Gozo Football League team Għajnsielem for the 2005–06 season.

A host of ex-Malta national team players were asked to join the club, and Graham was one of them, he was also joined by Maltese players Daniel Bogdanovic, Richard Buhagiar and David Carabott.

During his time with Għajnsielem, Graham won the Gozo Football League title.

Marsa
Graham returned to Malta for 2005–06 season, he joined First Division team Marsa.

In his first season Bencini achieved promotion back to the Premier League, after finishing in 2nd place.

During his two-year career with Marsa, Bencini made 39 appearances and was also the team captain.

Post-retirement
Since his retirement Graham has played for Valletta FC Futsal Club in the Maltese futsal league.

Honours

Sliema Wanderers
Winner
 1995/96, 2003/04 Maltese Premier League
 2004 Maltese Cup
 2004 MFA Super 5 Lottery Tournament

Birkirkara
Winner
 1999/00 Maltese Premier League
 1998 MFA Super 5 Lottery Tournament
 1998 Euro Challenge/Lowenbrau Cup

Għajnsielem
Winner
 2005 Gozo Football League

References

External links
 
 

Living people
1976 births
Maltese footballers
Malta international footballers
Sliema Wanderers F.C. players
Naxxar Lions F.C. players
Birkirkara F.C. players
Ħamrun Spartans F.C. players
Floriana F.C. players
Għajnsielem F.C. players
Marsa F.C. players
Tarxien Rainbows F.C. players
People from Sliema
Association football defenders